Taner Taktak (born 26 January 1990) is a Belgian-Turkish footballer who plays as a left winger for Belgian Division 3 club KVK Beringen.

Club career
Taktak made his professional debut on 22 February 2008, playing for Fortuna Sittard against FC Eindhoven in the Dutch Eerste Divisie. He came on as a late substitute for Danny Schreurs in a 3–0 win.

On 8 January 2010, Taktak signed with TFF First League club Hacettepe, alongside Fortuna teammate Abdülkerim Öcal. However, he left the club in disappointing fashion after failing to play consistently and not being paid all of his salary. In 2012, Taktak signed for Azerbaijani club Sumgayit before joining Sandıklıspor in the Turkish fourth division, after a move to Fethiyespor failed.

After that, he played for Belgian lower league teams Patro Eisden, KFC Helson Helchteren, Spouwen-Mopertingen and KVK Beringen.

References

External links
 Taner Taktak at Soccerway

1990 births
Living people
Belgian footballers
Turkish footballers
Turkey youth international footballers
Association football wingers
Belgian people of Turkish descent
People from Maaseik
Fortuna Sittard players
Hacettepe S.K. footballers
Sumgayit FK players
K. Patro Eisden Maasmechelen players
Eerste Divisie players
TFF First League players
Azerbaijan Premier League players
Belgian expatriate sportspeople in Azerbaijan
Turkish expatriate sportspeople in Azerbaijan
Expatriate footballers in Azerbaijan
Expatriate footballers in the Netherlands
Belgian expatriate sportspeople in the Netherlands
Turkish expatriate sportspeople in the Netherlands
Footballers from Limburg (Belgium)